Echeveria laui is a slow-growing perennial succulent plant native to the state of Oaxaca, Mexico. It is a popular decorative plant due to its distinctive pink color.

Etymology
Echeveria is named for Atanasio Echeverría y Godoy, a botanical illustrator who contributed to Flora Mexicana.

References

laui
Plants described in 1976